Barangja  is a village development committee in Myagdi District in the Dhaulagiri Zone of western-central Nepal. At the time of the 1991 Nepal census it had a population of 4576 people living in 891 individual households.

Barangja VDC in Myagdi district was declared the first fully literate area in the district in December 2015. The announcement was made as 95.2 percent of VDC's population can now read and write. Officials announced that all children had access to school in the VDC.

Resource person at the District Education Office Hari Krishna Sapkota said a total of 3,738 people between the ages of 15 and 60 years in the VDC are literate.

References

External links
UN map of the municipalities of Myagdi District

Populated places in Myagdi District